Namsangol Hanok Village, also known as "A Village of Traditional Houses in the Namsan Valley", is a Korean village located in the area of Pil-dong neighborhood in Jung-gu, a central district of Seoul, South Korea where hanok (한옥) or Korean traditional houses have been restored to preserve the original atmosphere of the area.

The Namsangol Hanok Village offers one the opportunity to experience a wide cross-section of Joseon-era citizenry and activities, from royalty to commoners. A great effort has been made to accurately furnish each dwelling with appropriate era and social status appointments.

History
The location of the village was originally the site of a well known Joseon-era summer resort called Jeonghakdong. Jeonghakdong means "The land of the fairies for the blue crane where the Jeonugak Pavilion stands along the stream in the valley".  The area boasted such superb scenery that it was called the land of the fairies and was considered one of the five most beautiful parts of Seoul.

A traditional Korean style garden, complete with a flowing stream and pavilion was constructed on the site in order to revive the classical feel of the Joseon-era.  Five traditional houses, including some of the residences of high government officials - some of the largest mansions in Seoul at the time, along with commoners houses were moved to the 7,934 sq Meters/9,489 sq Yards grounds containing the restored village.

Tourism
In 2011 in a survey conducted, by Seoul Development Institute, which included 800 residents and 103 urban planners and architects. It listed 52.4 percent of experts, voted that the palace as the most scenic location in Seoul, following Mount Namsan, Han River and Gyeongbokgung Palace in the top spots.

Visitor Guide 
Admission is free, every Tuesday is a day off. Close to Chungmuro Station, meet Seoul Metropolitan Subway Line 3 and Line 4.

Incident 
On November 24, 2012, a group of students from Yonsei University arrived here for a field trip. During the trip, one of the students was constantly complaining about how cold the weather was during the tour. Reportedly, after being left out in the cold for too long and the constant negligence of other students and the staff, the student fell into a mental breakdown, screaming and vandalizing everything around him, and had a physical fight with another student. The field trip, which was the most anticipated of the year, was cancelled prematurely due to this incident, and caused Yonsei's worst reputation plummets in 90 years. The student in question has been expelled.

Gallery

See also
Bukchon Hanok Village
Korean Folk Village
Hahoe Folk Village
Yangdong Village of Gyeongju

References

Jung District, Seoul
Architecture in Korea
Joseon dynasty
Folk villages in South Korea
Tourist attractions in Seoul